Carmolândia is a municipality located in the Brazilian state of Tocantins. Its population was 2,603 (2020) and its area is 339 km².

References

Municipalities in Tocantins